Charles III of Spain is the third surviving son of the first Bourbon King of Spain Philip V and Elisabeth Farnese. The descendants of Charles III of Spain, are numerous. Growing up in Madrid till he was 16, he was sent to the Italian Sovereign Duchy of Parma and Piacenza which, through his mother Elisabeth of Parma, was considered his birthright. Charles married only once, to the cultured Princess Maria Amalia of Saxony, with whom he had 13 children; 8 of these reached adulthood (most dying young of smallpox) and only 4 of these had issue.

A younger son of Charles would found the House of Bourbon-Two Sicilies, while his younger brother would found the House of Bourbon-Parma. This article deals with the children of Charles III and in turn their senior descendants.

Background of Charles
The future Charles III (Real Alcázar de Madrid, Madrid, Kingdom of Spain, 20 January 1716 – Royal Palace of Madrid, Madrid, Kingdom of Spain, 14 December 1788) was the King of Spain and the Spanish Indies from 1759 to his death in 1788.

Eldest son of Philip V of Spain and his second wife, Princess Elisabeth of Parma, he became the Duke of Parma and Piacenza under the name of Charles I (at the death of his great uncle Antonio Farnese); later on in 1734 while Duke of Parma he conquered the Kingdoms of Naples and Sicily and was thus created the King of Naples and Sicily due to a personal union; he ruled under the simple name of Charles with no specific numeration even though time has made him Charles VII of Naples and Charles V and Sicily. In Sicily, he was known as Charles III of Sicily and of Jerusalem; using the ordinal one III rather than V for the Sicilian people did not recognise as their sovereign legitimate one or Charles I of Naples (Charles d'Anjou), against whom they rebelled, nor the Emperor Charles, quickly discharged of the island. He was crowned King of Naples and Sicily at Palermo, Sicily on 3 July 1735.

After becoming the King of Spain by default, he left the Neapolitan and Sicilian kingdoms to his third surviving son who was later Ferdinand IV of Naples; Ferdinand III of Sicily; Ferdinand would see the creation of the future Kingdom of the Two Sicilies which would be ruled by Charles' descendants till 1861.

He was a proponent of enlightened absolutism.

Maria Amalia of Saxony
She was born at the Zwinger Palace in Dresden, the daughter of Augustus III of Poland, Elector of Saxony and Maria Josepha, herself daughter of Joseph I, Holy Roman Emperor. Her full name was Maria Amalia Christina Franziska Xaveria Flora Walburga von Sachsen. One of 15 children, she was the sister of Frederick Christian, Elector of Saxony,

In 1737 Maria Amalia became engaged to the future Charles III of Spain. The marriage date was confirmed on 31 October 1737. In 1738, at the age of 14, Maria Amalia married Charles of Bourbon, then King of Naples and Sicily. Despite the fact that this was an arranged marriage, the couple was very close and had many children. Maria Amalia had a proxy ceremony at Dresden in May 1738 with her brother.

The couple met for the first time on 19 June 1738 at Portella.

At the end of 1758, Charles' half brother Ferdinand VI was displaying the same symptoms of depression that their father used to suffer from. Ferdinand lost his devoted wife, Infanta Barbara of Portugal in August 1758 and would fall into deep mourning for her. He named Charles his heir on 10 December 1758 before leaving Madrid to stay at Villaviciosa de Odón where he died on 10 August 1759. In September 1760, a year after arriving in Madrid, Maria Amalia died from tuberculosis at the Buen Retiro Palace outside the capital. She was buried at the Royal Crypt in El Escorial. She was joined by her devoted husband in 1788.

Issue

Princess Maria Isabel
Maria Isabel Antonietta de Padua Francisca Januaria Francisca de Paula Juana Nepomucena Josefina Onesifora of Naples and Sicily was born at the Palace of Portici, Portici, Modern Italy, 6 September 1740, she died in  Naples on 2 November 1742. Due to being a male line descendant of Philip V of Spain (paternal grandfather) she was an Infanta of Spain.

Princess Maria Josefa
Born Princess Maria Josefa Antonietta of Naples and Sicily at the Palace of Portici on 20 January 1742 she later died in Naples on 1 April 1742. She was an Infanta of Spain.

Princess Maria Isabel Ana
Princess Maria Isabel Ana was born at the Palace of Capodimonte on 30 April 1743; the young princess died at Capodimonte on 5 March 1749 three weeks before her sixth birthday. She was an Infanta of Spain.

Princess Maria Josefa
Princess Maria Josefa Carmela was born at Gaeta in Italy on 6 July 1744; the first of the Charles' childrent to live past their fifth birthday, she died in Madrid on 8 December 1801; despite her long life little is known of her. She was an Infanta of Spain.

Princess Maria Luisa

Born at the Palace of Portici on 24 November 1745, she would die at the Imperial Palace of the Hofburg in Vienna, 15 May 1792 aged 46. She would marry Leopold II, Holy Roman Emperor and become the future Holy Roman Empress; Queen consort of the Romans, Hungary and Bohemia; Archduchess consort of Austria; Grand Duchess consort of Tuscany. Despite being born as Princess Maria Luisa of Naples and Sicily, her "style" changed to Infanta Maria Luisa of Spain after 1759 when her father became King of Spain. She was buried in the Imperial Crypt in Vienna.

Prince Felipe
Prince Felipe Antonio Genaro Pasquale Francesco de Paula of Naples and Sicily was born the first son at the Palace of Portici, 13 June 1747; titled the Duke of Calabria, he was excluded from succession to the throne due to his mental conditions; he died at the Palace of Portici, 19 September 1777 and was buried in Naples.  He was an Infante of Spain.

Charles IV of Spain
Prince Carlos Antonio Pascual Francisco Javier Juan Nepomuceno Jose Januario Serafin Diego of Naples and Sicily

Princess Maria Teresa
Maria Teresa Antonieta Francisca Javier Francisca de Paula Serafina was born at the Royal Palace of Naples, 2 December 1749; the young princess died at the Palace of Portici on 2 May 1750. She was an Infanta of Spain.

Ferdinand I of the Two Sicilies

|-
| Ferdinand I1816–1825 ||  || 12 January 1751Naplesson of Charles VII and Maria Amalia of Saxony||Marie Caroline of Austria12 May 176817 childrenLucia Migliaccio of Floridia27 November 1814No children||4 January 1825Naplesaged 73
|-
| Francis I1825–1830||  || 14 August 1777Naplesson of Ferdinand I and Maria Carolina of Austria||Maria Isabella of Spain6 July 180212 children||8 November 1830Naplesaged 53
|-
| Ferdinand II1830–1859 ||  || 12 January 1810Palermoson of Francis I and Maria Isabella of Spain||Maria Christina of Savoy21 November 18321 childMaria Theresa of Austria9 January 183712 children||22 May 1859Casertaaged 49
|-
| Francis II1859–1861||  || 16 January 1836Naplesson of Ferdinand II and Maria Christina of Savoy||Maria Sophie of Bavaria8 January 18591 child||27 December 1894Arcoaged 58
|-
| Prince Alfonso, Count of Caserta1894–1934||  || 28 March 1841Casertason of Ferdinand II of the Two Sicilies and Maria Theresa of Austria||Princess Antonietta of Bourbon-Two Sicilies8 June 186812 children||26 May 1934Cannesaged 93
|-
| Prince Ferdinand Pius, Duke of Calabria1934–1960||  || 25 July 1869Romeson of Prince Alfonso, Count of Caserta and Princess Maria Antonietta of Bourbon-Two Sicilies||Princess Maria Ludwiga Theresia of Bavaria31 May 18976 children||7 January 1960Lindauaged 90
|-
| Princess Maria Cristina of Bourbon-Two Sicilies1960–1985|| || 4 May 1899Madriddaughter of Prince Ferdinand Pius, Duke of Calabria and Princess Maria Ludwiga Theresia of Bavaria||Manuel Sotomayor Luna3 March 1948no children||21 April 1985Quito, Ecuadoraged 85
|-
| Princess Lucia of Bourbon-Two Sicilies1985–2001|| || 9 July 1908Nymphenburg Palace, Munich, Bavariadaughter of Prince Ferdinand Pius, Duke of Calabria and Princess Maria Ludwiga Theresia of Bavaria||Eugenio, 5th Duke of Genoa29 October 19381 child||3 November 2001São Paulo, Brazilaged 93
|-
| Princess Maria Isabella of Savoy-Genoa2001–||  || 23 June 1943Romedaughter of Princess Lucia of Bourbon-Two Sicilies and Eugenio, 5th Duke of Genoa||Alberto Frioli7 April 19434 children||
|}

Prince Gabriel

Prince Gabriel Antonio Francisco Javier Juan Nepomuceno José Serafin Pascual Salvador of Naples and Sicily was born at the Palace of Portici, 11 May 1752;  married Infanta Mariana Vitória of Portugal, daughter of Maria I of Portugal; had three children two of which died young; died at his private residence, the Casita del Infante, San Lorenzo de El Escorial, Spain, 23 November 1788.

Princess Maria Ana
Born at the Palace of Portici, 3 July 1754; she died at the Palace of Capodimonte, 11 May 1755. She was an Infanta of Spain.

Prince Antonio Pascual
Prince Antonio Pascual Francisco Javier Juan Nepomuceno Aniello Raimundo Sylvestre of Naples and Sicily was born at the Caserta Palace, 31 December 1755; he married his niece, Infanta Maria Amalia of Spain (1779–1798) in 1795 and had no issue. He died in Madrid on 20 April 1817. He is more commonly known as Infante Antonio Pascual. He was buried at El Escorial.

Prince Francis
Prince Francisco Javier Antonio Pascual Bernardo Francisco de Paula Juan Nepomuceno Aniello Julian of Naples and Sicily was born at the Caserta Palace on 15 February 1757 little is known of the youngest of Charles' children but he did move to Spain with his parents in 1759; he died unmarried and without known issue at the Royal Palace of Aranjuez, Spain on 10 April 1771. He was buried at El Escorial.

See also
Descendants of Henry IV of France
Descendants of Philip V of Spain
Bourbon Claim to the Spanish Throne

References

Lists of Spanish nobility
Spanish royalty
House of Bourbon (Spain)
Charles III of Spain
Spanish monarchy
House of Bourbon